Limoges Cathedral is a Roman Catholic church located in Limoges, France. It is a national monument and the seat of the Bishop of Limoges. The cathedral is in the Gothic, Renaissance and Romanesque architectural styles.

The construction of the church began in 1273 and finished only in 1888, when the nave was connected to the belfry, a fine, partly octagonal, bell tower. It is noted for its Renaissance rood screen with reliefs of the labors of Hercules, built in 1534 and moved to the western end of the nave during the revolution, and for the tomb of the bishop  Jean de Langeac (who commissioned the rood screen) on which are carved scenes of the Apocalypse, inspired by Dürer.

Architecture

Nave and choir, respectively, looking east, through a "folding out" lens that nearly flattens out the steep Gothic arches.

The walls of Romanesque crypt have beautiful frescoes representing Christ in glory. Some medieval paintings are still visible in some chapels (including representatives of angelic musicians) but almost all are frescoes of the 19th century.

The Cathedral of Limoges has two organs: a neoclassical instrument built by Georges Danion in 1963 and a choir organ, installed in 1850. and restored 1891 by Merklin. Every summer, the association of the cathedral organizes organ concerts to highlight the major organs of this building.

Gallery

External links

 Location

Roman Catholic cathedrals in France
Churches in Haute-Vienne
Cathedral